Aldo Junior Simoncini (born 30 August 1986) is a Sammarinese footballer who plays as a goalkeeper for Sammarinese club Tre Fiori and the San Marino national team.

Club career
At the age of 19 his career was nearly ended after he suffered serious injuries in a car crash.

Simoncini was signed by Italian club Cesena in 2011. In January 2012 he was signed by Valenzana on a loan deal.

International career 
Simoncini and his twin brother, Davide, both scored an own goal each against Sweden on 7 September 2010, becoming the first twins to accomplish such a feat in an international competition.

Personal life 
Simoncini worked as an accountant while also playing football.

References

External links 
 Official Player Profile at cesenacalcio.it
 Player Stats at tuttocalciatori.net
 

Living people
1986 births
Sammarinese footballers
San Marino international footballers
Modena F.C. players
A.S.D. Victor San Marino players
A.C. Bellaria Igea Marina players
A.C. Cesena players
A.C. Libertas players
S.P. Tre Fiori players
Sammarinese twins
Twin sportspeople
Campionato Sammarinese di Calcio players
Association football goalkeepers